Renton Millar (born 30 June 1975) is a professional vertical skateboarder from Melbourne, Australia.

Career
Millar is a professional skateboarder, competition announcer and Olympic Skateboarding Judge from Melbourne, Australia.

Millar came to prominence in 2001 when his sponsor Globe Shoes video, Opinion was released, sharing a video part with Ben Pappas (1977–2007), and showcased such innovational technical vert skateboarding tricks as 360 flip crooked grind, nollie flip 5-0 and kick flip nose grind shove it on a vert ramp.
Between 2000 and 2003 Millar rode for Think skateboards, having several pro model skateboards. In 2009 Millar released a pro board on XEN skateboards.

Turning pro at the World Cup event  "The Munster Monster Mastership" in 1998 in Münster, Germany, he competed in many World Cup events such as the X Games (10th place, 2000 Philadelphia), (13th place, 2011, Los Angeles). Gravity Games (9th place 2000, 10th place 2002), Vans Triple Crown (United States), Mystic Cup (Czech Republic, 2nd place 2002, 2004) and Slam City Jam (Vancouver, Canada). In 2003, Millar was Asian X Games Champion (Kuala Lumpur, Malaysia) and in 2005 was Asian X Silver medalist (Seoul, Korea). In 2006 he again won Silver at Asian X Games (Kuala Lumpur, Malaysia). In 2008 Millar won the CPH pro, in Copenhagen Denmark, and competed in the AST Dew tour: placing 6th in Baltimore and 6th in Cleveland (for an 8th place over end result in the standings). In 2009 Millar won the "Oi" Jam in Rio de Janeiro, Brazil, as well as the Timtribu World Cup in Rome, as well as placed 6th at the World Championships of Skateboarding, in the first stop of the AST Dew tour in Boston. After an 8th-place finish at the Toyota Cup in Salt Lake City Millar ended 10th place overall in the end of year AST Dew Tour Standings. In 2009 Millar also placed 3rd at the ESPN Asian XGames in Shanghai, 4th in the AST China Invitational (Beijing), and also won the Chungcheong Korean Xtreme contest.

Millar ended 2009 as World Cup Vert Points Champion, (taking World Cup Points from Rio de Janeiro, Shanghai, Rome, and Berlin). In 2012 Millar won the first Hurley ABC Contest (Australian Bowlriding Championship), becoming the first inaugarel Australian Bowlriding Champion.

Millar made a guest appearance in Australian soap opera Neighbours in 2002.

He also has his own short show on Fuel TV Australia, called "Bailgun Diary" and has hosted such shows as "Bondi Bowlarama". Millar has also been a long time campaigner for a skatepark to be built on the foreshore of StKilda in Victoria.

Personal life
Renton Millar is married to Chelsie Millar and has two children, son Max Millar and daughter Bonnie Millar.

References

1975 births
Living people
Australian skateboarders
Sportspeople from Melbourne
X Games athletes